In the 2013 season, Djurgårdens IF competes in the Allsvenskan and Svenska Cupen.  Magnus Pehrsson is managing the team for the third year. In July, the team will move to the newly built Tele2 Arena.

Squad information

Squad
 
 updated April 4, 2013

Transfers

In

Out

Loans in

Loans out

Player statistics 
Appearances for competitive matches only

|}

Goals

Total

Allsvenskan

Svenska Cupen

Competitions

Overall

Allsvenskan

League table

Matches
Kickoff times are in UTC+2 unless stated otherwise.

2012–13 Svenska Cupen

Group stage

Knockout stage

2013–14 Svenska Cupen

Preliminary rounds

Friendlies

References

Djurgardens
Djurgårdens IF Fotboll seasons